Ehlmann is a surname. Notable people with the surname include:

Bethany Ehlmann, American scientist
Steve Ehlmann (born 1950), American politician

See also
Ehmann